Deauzya "DiDi" Richards (born February 8, 1999) is an American basketball player for the New York Liberty of the Women’s National Basketball Association (WNBA). She played college for the Baylor Lady Bears. Following the 2019–20 season, Richards was named WBCA Defensive Player of the Year and Naismith Defensive Player of the Year Award as well as Big 12 Defensive Player of the Year. She averaged  8.2 points and 4.9 rebounds per game, and had 52 steals and 25 blocked shots.

College career

Had a breakout season as a sophomore, starting in all 38 games and helping the Lady Bears to a national championship ... Known for her solid on-ball defense, she was selected to the Big 12 All-Defensive Team and was named Defensive Player of the Year.

Her reputation as one of the nation’s top on-ball defenders headed into her junior season was solidified when she swept National Defensive Player of the Year Awards from both Naismith and the WBCA. Named as the Big 12 Defensive Player of the Year. Ranked 14th and 13th in the NCAA, respectively, in assists (171) and assists per game (5.7) while leading the Big 12 in both categories. Her 171 assists in the COVID-19-shortened season still ranked as the sixth-best total among Baylor juniors all-time. Played and started in all 30 games for Baylor, averaging a team-best 29.9 minutes per contest.

Baylor statistics

Source

WNBA career statistics

Regular season

|-
| style='text-align:left;'|2021
| style='text-align:left;'|New York
| 31 || 0 || 11.2 || .422 || .455 || .600 || 1.1 || 0.8 || 0.5 || 0.2 || 0.5 || 2.3
|-
| style='text-align:left;'|2022
| style='text-align:left;'|New York
| 14 || 0 || 11.1 || .306 || .273 || .700 || 1.7 || 1.4 || 0.1 || 0.4 || 0.9 || 2.3
|-
| style='text-align:left;'| Career
| style='text-align:left;'| 2 years, 1 team
| 45 || 0 || 11.1 || .380 || .394 || .650 || 1.3 || 1.0 || 0.4 || 0.2 || 0.6 || 2.3

Playoffs

|-
| style='text-align:left;'|2021
| style='text-align:left;'|New York
| 1 || 0 || 12.0 || 1.000 || 1.000 || .000 || 1.0 || 0.0 || 0.0 || 0.0 || 0.0 || 5.0
|-
| style='text-align:left;'|2022
| style='text-align:left;'|New York
| 2 || 0 || 8.5 || .400 || .000 || 1.000 || 1.5 || 1.0 || 1.0 || 0.0 || 2.0 || 4.0
|-
| align="left" | Career
| align="left" | 2 years, 1 team
| 3 || 0 || 9.7 || .571 || .333 || 1.000 || 1.3 || 0.7 || 0.7 || 0.0 || 1.3 || 4.3
|}

References

External links
Baylor Bears bio
WNBA draft bio

1999 births
Living people
All-American college women's basketball players
American women's basketball players
Basketball players from Houston
Baylor Bears women's basketball players
Guards (basketball)
McDonald's High School All-Americans
New York Liberty draft picks
New York Liberty players
People from Cypress, Texas